Avvakumovo is a rural locality (a village) and the administrative center of Avvakumovskoye Rural Settlement of Kalininsky District, Tver Oblast, Russia. The population was 1284 as of 2017. There are 27 streets.

Geography 
Avvakumovo is located 8 km northeast of Tver (the district's administrative centre) by road. Zhdanovo is the nearest rural locality.

References 

Rural localities in Kalininsky District
Tverskoy Uyezd